South Ridge High School is a public charter high school in Phoenix, Arizona. It is operated by The Leona Group. Nearly 70% of its student population is Hispanic, and over three-quarters are below the federal poverty line. The school itself lacks many facilities a typical high school would normally have, such as an auditorium and multiple sports facilities that are not a basketball court. 

For athletics, it is a member of the Canyon Athletic Association (CAA).

Public high schools in Arizona
The Leona Group
Charter schools in Arizona
High schools in Phoenix, Arizona
Educational institutions established in 2006
2006 establishments in Arizona